Paderna is a surname. Notable people with the surname include:

Giovanni Paderna (17th century), Italian painter
Paolo Antonio Paderna (1649–1708), Italian painter

Italian-language surnames